Florida Hills is a suburb of Johannesburg in Gauteng Province, South Africa. It lies to the northwest of downtown Johannesburg and north of Soweto. It is a suburb of Roodepoort.

References

Johannesburg Region C